The 1954–55 Hapoel Hadera season was the club's 22nd season since its establishment, in 1934, and 7th since the establishment of the State of Israel.

During the season, the club competed in Liga Alef (top division) and the State Cup.

Match Results

Legend

Liga Alef
 
League matches began on 6 February 1955, and by the time the season, only 20 rounds of matches were completed, delaying the end of the league season to the next season.

League table (as of 2 July 1955)

Source:

Matches

Results by match

State Cup

References

Hapoel Hadera F.C. seasons
Hapoel Hadera